Georges Thines (10 February 1923 – 25 October 2016) was a Belgian scientist. He was awarded the Francqui Prize on Human Sciences in 1971 for his work on experimental psychology at the Laboratory of Experimental Psychology of the Universite Catholique de Louvain.

References

External links
 Laboratory of Experimental Psychology(history) 

1923 births
2016 deaths
Belgian psychologists
Academic staff of KU Leuven